Cecil Carston (19 April 1927 – 19 October 2014) was a New Zealand cricketer. He played in two first-class matches for Canterbury in 1946/47.

See also
 List of Canterbury representative cricketers

References

External links
 

1927 births
2014 deaths
New Zealand cricketers
Canterbury cricketers
Cricketers from Christchurch